The following lists events in the year 2013 in Turkey.

Incumbents
President: Abdullah Gül 
Prime Minister: Recep Tayyip Erdoğan
Speaker: Cemil Çiçek

Events

January
7 January - An explosion at a coal mine in the Zonguldak province kills eight miners.
17 January - Thousands of Kurds pour into the streets of Diyarbakır to mourn the death of Sakine Cansız, the founder of the Kurdistan Workers' Party, who was killed in Paris, France on the 9th.

February
1 February - The United States embassy is bombed in the capital of Ankara, killing 2 people.
2 February - Radical leftist group Revolutionary People's Liberation Party/Front claims responsibility for yesterday's bombing.

March
13 March - Kurdish rebels free eight Turkish citizens who have been held captive for two years.
19 March - Two people are injured in bombings on Turkey's justice ministry and headquarters of the governing AK Party in Ankara. This was allegedly done by Kurdish militants.
21 March - PKK leader Abdullah Öcalan makes historic calls for peace talks with Turkey after nearly 30 years of violent conflict.
22 March - Israeli Prime Minister Benjamin Netanyahu apologises to Prime Minister Erdogan for the killing of nine activists in a raid on Gaza and the US reports they are normalising relations.

April
7 April - US Secretary of State John Kerry arrives in Turkey where discussions over relations with Israel and the Syrian civil war are expected to take place.

May
20 May - A hot air balloon crashes in Cappadocia resulting in 2 tourists dying and another 20 injured.
31 May - Protesters are violently removed by riot police in Gezi Park, Taksim Square, Istanbul after days of anti-government unrest based on government attempts in making the country more religious.

June
3 June - Riot police fire tear gas on protesters continuing to demand the downfall of the current government in Istanbul and Ankara.

Deaths
22 February – Behsat Üvez, singer-songwriter, 53 (lung cancer)
20 September – Ercan Aktuna
29 September – İsmet Kür (born 1916), educator, journalist, columnist and writer
25 December – Adnan Şenses

See also
2013 in Turkish television
List of Turkish films of 2013

References

 
Years of the 21st century in Turkey
2010s in Turkey
Turkey
Turkey
Turkey